Márcio Alexandre Henriques Gonçalves Santos (born 5 May 1979 in Lisbon) is a Portuguese retired footballer who played as a goalkeeper.

External links

1979 births
Living people
Footballers from Lisbon
Portuguese footballers
Primeira Liga players
Liga Portugal 2 players
Segunda Divisão players
Association football goalkeepers
Sporting CP footballers
F.C. Felgueiras players
Associação Académica de Coimbra – O.A.F. players
C.F. Estrela da Amadora players
Odivelas F.C. players
C.D. Olivais e Moscavide players
C.D. Mafra players
S.C.U. Torreense players
GS Loures players
Portugal youth international footballers
Portugal under-21 international footballers